, also known as  in Okinawan, is a mountain in Kunigami on the main island of Okinawa in Okinawa Prefecture.

Etymology

The kanji are ateji, or kanji used phonetically to represent native or borrowed words.

Geography

It is formed from schist, phyllite, and sandstone, and dates from the Tertiary period to the mid-Mesozoic era. It appears as a gentle slope, but its summit is surrounded by a series of complex valleys. It is the highest mountain on the island and the second highest in the prefecture after Mount Omoto  in Ishigaki, Okinawa. It is part of the Okinawa Kaigan Quasi-National Park, and the highest mountain in the park. A paved road extends from the village of Kunigami at the mountain's base to its summit. 

Mount Yonaha is home to the largest waterfall on Okinawa Island, the Hiji Waterfall. Due to the effect of the Kuroshio Current, the mountain is almost always covered in fog.

Rivers

Yanbaru forest

Mount Yonaha is at the center of the Yanbaru forest that spans the villages of Higashi, Kunigami, and Ōgimi. Yanbaru contains some of the last large surviving tracts of subtropical rainforest in Asia, and the mountain is lush with evergreens forests. While Mount Yonaha is an important natural habitat to numerous species of plants, birds, and animals, its ecology has been negatively affected by agricultural development at its base, and lumbering and the subsequent establishment of second-growth forest.

Military installation

External links
与那覇岳天然保護区

References

Mountains of Okinawa Prefecture
Places of Scenic Beauty
Kunigami, Okinawa